Sirindhornia curvicosta is a species of moth of the family Tortricidae. It is found in Thailand. The habitat consist of secondary forests.

The length of the forewings is about 5.2 mm. The basal two-fifths of the forewings is white, with various slender, connected black lines concentrated towards the base and distally white with a few black dots. The distal three-fifths are reddish orange, its inner margin near the costa preceded by black spots and followed by a parallel angled silvery band. The hindwings are dark, with a narrow orange patch along the termen and a narrow orange streak in the center.

Etymology
The species name refers to the strongly curved costa of the forewing just before the apex.

References

Moths described in 2014
Enarmoniini
Moths of Asia